This was the first edition of the tournament.

Saketh Myneni and Jeevan Nedunchezhiyan won the title, defeating Denys Molchanov and Aleksandr Nedovyesov 6–3, 6–3 in the final.

Seeds

Draw

References
 Main Draw

TAC Cup Nanjing Challenger - Doubles